Florian Meyer (born 21 November 1968) is a former German football referee who is based in Burgdorf. He refereed for RSV Braunschweig of the Lower Saxony Football Association.

Refereeing career
He has officiated in the German Football Association (DFB) since 1996 and he was a FIFA-referee from 2002 to 2013. He was fourth official for the 2007 UEFA Champions League Final between A.C. Milan and Liverpool.

Meyer retired from officiating in 2016 because he reached the age limit for German referees, which is 47. His final Bundesliga match officiated was between FC Augsburg and Hamburger SV.

Personal life
Meyer lives in Burgdorf and is a firm manager.

References

External links
 Profile at worldfootball.net

1968 births
Living people
German football referees
Sportspeople from Braunschweig
UEFA Europa League referees